Scarnafigi is a comune (municipality) in the Province of Cuneo in the Italian region Piedmont, located about  south of Turin and about  north of Cuneo.

Scarnafigi borders the following municipalities: Lagnasco, Monasterolo di Savigliano, Ruffia, Saluzzo, Savigliano, Torre San Giorgio, and Villanova Solaro.

References

Cities and towns in Piedmont